Esmeralda Agoglia (29 August 1923 - 24 October 2014) was a former Argentine prima ballerina, choreographer and director of Argentina's Ballet Estable.

Biography
Agoglia joined the Ballet Estable at the Teatro Colón in Buenos Aires in 1942. From 1949 to 1976 she was the company's prima ballerina.

References

1923 births
Argentine ballerinas
Prima ballerinas
Actresses from Buenos Aires
Argentine choreographers
2014 deaths